Convoy QP 13 was an Arctic convoy of the PQ/QP series which ran during the Second World War. It was the thirteenth of the numbered series of convoys of merchant ships westbound from the Arctic ports of Arkhangelsk and Murmansk to the United Kingdom, Iceland, and North America.

Ships
Convoy QP 13 consisted of 35 merchant ships, most of which had arrived with PQ 16. The convoy commodore was Capt. NH Gale RNR in Empire Selwyn. Most of the ships were returning empty after delivering war material to the Soviet Union, but some Soviet ships carried cargoes of export timber.
The covering force was commanded by Admiral John Tovey aboard the flagship Duke of York.

Voyage
The Hunt-class destroyers detached on 4 July when convoy QP 13 was out of range of German bombers.

Convoy QP 13 encountered fog on 5 July 1942. In poor visibility Niger mistook an iceberg for Iceland’s North Western Cape and six merchant ships followed her into Northern Barrage minefield SN72 laid one month earlier at the entrance to the Denmark Strait. All seven ships detonated naval mines, and there were only eight survivors of the 127 men aboard Niger. Only Exterminator could be salvaged. No crewmen were lost from Exterminator, Hybert and Rodina; but one crewman died abandoning Hefron, five drowned when John Randolph broke in two, and Massmar sank with 17 merchant seamen, 5 Naval Armed Guards, and 26 survivors she was carrying from the sinking of Alamar in convoy PQ 16.

Surviving ships destined for Reykjavík were escorted into port on 7 July by a local escort of naval trawlers Saint Elstan and Lady Madeleine.

Ships involved

References

Further reading
 Blair, Clay. Hitler's U-Boat War Vol I. (1996) .
 Kemp, Paul. Convoy! Drama in Arctic Waters (1993) 
 G Ogden (1963) My Sea Lady ISBN (none)
 R Ruegg, A Hague (1992) Convoys to Russia 

QP 13
Naval battles of World War II involving Germany
Naval battles of World War II involving the United Kingdom